The University of Kentucky College of Engineering is an ABET accredited, public engineering school located on the campus of the University of Kentucky. The college has eight departments. The college operates the University of Kentucky College of Engineering Extended Campus at Paducah in partnership with West Kentucky Community and Technical College in Paducah, Kentucky, offering bachelor's degrees in chemical engineering and mechanical engineering.

The college offers nine undergraduate degrees: biosystems engineering, chemical engineering, civil engineering, computer engineering, computer science, electrical engineering, materials engineering, mechanical engineering, and mining engineering. It also offers master's and doctoral degrees in biomedical engineering, biosystems engineering, chemical engineering, civil engineering, computer science, electrical engineering, materials engineering, mechanical engineering, and mining engineering. A master's degree in manufacturing systems engineering is available online.

Engineering education at the University of Kentucky goes back to the founding of the university as a Land-grant university in 1865. William Benjamin Munson, the University of Kentucky's first graduate in 1869, studied engineering and became a prosperous entrepreneur. John Wesley Gunn, Class of 1890, earned the first awarded engineering degree. Margaret Ingels earned a mechanical engineering degree in 1916, becoming the first woman to receive an engineering degree from the University of Kentucky College of Engineering. When she later received a master's degree in mechanical engineering, she made history as the first woman in the United States to earn a graduate degree in engineering. The first African-American student to receive an undergraduate degree from the University of Kentucky was Holloway Fields Jr., who graduated with an electrical engineering degree in 1951.

The college currently occupies approximately 320,000 square feet of space. College administration resides in the Ralph G. Anderson Building, which opened in 2002. Thomas W. Lester served as dean from 1990 to 2012, the longest tenure for any dean at the University of Kentucky in its history. In 2018, the college hired  Rudolph G. Buchheit from the College of Engineering at Ohio State to serve as dean.

A Major Contribution to the War Effort
One of the advancements is the military engineering training students received during World War II. During this time, the College of Engineering added curriculum to specifically support the war effort. The picture to the right is Harley E. Huddle Sr. as he stands next to his wife who is also a notable alumni at the College of Engineering at the University of Kentucky. Mr. Huddle attended the University of Kentucky and was an inventor. He created an engineering business during World War II that automated the cleaning of aluminum cans during the manufacturing process.  Mr. Huddle gives credit for his business success directly to the education he received at the University of Kentucky. For future generations of UK engineering students, Mr. Huddle's family established a scholarship fund providing a way for today's engineering students to benefit from his success. The University of Kentucky College of Engineering provided man advancements to modern day revolutions and technology. An example of this is a research project that includes the impact of environmental conditions on fixed-wing and unmanned aerial systems(UASs). In 2018, the University of Kentucky College of Engineering studied the lower atmospheric impact on unmanned aerial systems. UASs are being tested as potential lower flying options to enable services like drone package delivery. Understanding the atmospheric impact on these aerial systems is an important step to making unmanned aerial systems a reality. All these research projects are clear examples of the long lasting impact the University of Kentucky's College of Engineering had on war efforts.

Notable alumni
 Ralph G. Anderson, founder of Belcan Corporation
 Matt Cutts, early Google employee and former head of Google's web spam team
 Mark E. Davis, current professor at Caltech and member of the National Academy of Engineering
 Margaret Ingels, pioneer of air conditioning technology, advocate for women in engineering
 Sannie Overly, member of the Kentucky House of Representatives
 Paul Patton, 59th Governor of Kentucky
 Murray Raney, American mechanical engineer, developer of Raney nickel
 Lee Todd, inventor, entrepreneur, and 11th president of the University of Kentucky
 William T. Young, businessman and philanthropist

Notable student projects
UK Solar Car Team
UK IEEE Robotics Team

References

External links
 

Engineering
Kentucky
Kentucky
Engineering universities and colleges in Kentucky
1865 establishments in Kentucky